Gusli is the oldest East Slavic multi-string plucked instrument, belonging to the zither family, due to its strings being parallel to its resonance board. Its roots lie in Veliky Novgorod in Novgorodian Rus'. It may have a connection to the Byzantine form of the Greek kithara, which in turn derived from the ancient lyre, or might have been imported from Western and Central Europe during the Middle Ages, when the zither had immense popularity. It has its relatives in Europe and throughout the world: kantele in Finland, kannel in Estonia, kanklės in Lithuania, kokles in Latvia, Zither in Germany, citera in the Czech Republic, psalterium in France and so on... Furthermore, the kanun has been found in Arabic countries, and the autoharp, in the United States. It is also related to such ancient instruments as Chinese gu zheng, which has a thousand-year history, and its Japanese relative koto. A stringed musical instrument called  is listed as one of the Me in ancient Sumer.

Etymology

In the times of Kievan Rus', the term Gusli is thought to simply refer to any generic stringed instrument. The root of the term comes from the word to make sound in the wind. The term was eventually associated with the trapezoidal Gusli-psaltyry (which may have originated in Byzantium).

History

The Gusli is one of the oldest musical instruments that have played an important role in the Russian music culture. Vertkov states that the first mentions of the Gusli date back to 591 AD to a treatise by the Greek historian Theophylact Simocatta which describes the instrument being used by Slavs from the area of the later Kievan Rus' kingdom. However, it is not exactly clear what instrument was meant by that word, because in Old Slavic or Old Russian "gusli" was used to refer to any stringed instrument. The first documented gusli were recorded in 1170 in Veliky Novgorod in Novgorodian Rus'. The Greek historian Theophan also mentioned the gusli. During the war at the end of the 6th century, the Greeks took Slavonic prisoners and found a musical instrument named the Gusli. This corresponds to what the Arabic authors Al-Masudi and Ibn-Dasta mentioned in the 10th century.

The gusli are thought to have been the instrument used by the legendary Boyan (a singer of tales) described in the Lay of Igor's campaign.

The instruments were used by the wandering Skomorokh musicians and entertainers. Preserved instruments discovered by archaeologists in various digs have between five and nine strings with one example having twelve strings.

Types
Folk Gusli have from eleven to thirty-six gut or metal strings, tuned diatonically. There were two main forms: helmet-shaped (Shlemovidnye gusli – ) and wing-shaped (Krylovidnye gusli).

Shlemovidnye gusli
Shlemovidnye gusli (Helmet-shaped gusli) is a variety of Gusli held by the musician on his knees, so that the strings are horizontal, the resonator body under them. He uses his left hand to mute unnecessary strings and thus form chords, while strumming all the strings with his right hand. The instrument was spread in southern and western regions of Kievan Rus'.

Krylovidnye gusli

Krylovidnye gusli ("wing-shaped gusli") is much smaller, and has more resemblance to Baltic psaltery such as the kankles, kokles, kannel and kantele. They are held much more like modern guitars (although the strings are still muted by the left hand through a special opening in the instrument's body). This modification was more prevalent in northern parts of Russia, especially Novgorod and Pskov.

Clavichord Gusli
The Clavichord Gusli ["Claviroobraznie Gusli" |] is a 19th-century derivative with an iron frame and metal strings tuned chromatically. It stands on a stand or table legs. The instrument has a keyboard. Pressing the keys of the keyboard would raise the dampers on specific strings and allow the player to play glissandi and arpeggios over the range of the strings. This instrument is used primarily in Russian folk instrument orchestras.

Related instruments

A number of Slavic folk music instruments have names which are related to Gusli such as the Czech violin housle and the Balkan one-stringed fiddle gusle. In western Ukraine and Belarus, husli can also refer to a fiddle or even a ducted flute. The violin-like variant of the instrument is also related to the South Slavic gusle.

The psaltery variant is related to the zither. It is also related to the Lithuanian kanklės, the Latvian kokles, the Estonian kannel and the Finnish kantele. Together these instruments make up the family known as Baltic psalteries.

A related instrument is the tsymbaly, a hammered dulcimer.

In Ukraine, it is thought that the gusli may have influenced the development of the multi-stringed bandura, which largely replaced it in the nineteenth century.

Modern Russian performers
Olga Glazova
Elena Frolova
Olga Shishkina
Alexander Matochkin
Alexey Belkin

See also
Ethnic Russian music
Sergey Nikolaevich Starostin

References

External links

 — also has a paragraph on the Gusli

Baltic psaltery
Ukrainian musical instruments
Russian musical instruments